Ferydoon Zandi (born 26 April 1979) is an Iranian retired professional footballer.

Early life
Zandi was born in the city of Emden, in northern Germany, to an Iranian father and a German mother. He speaks German and Persian. He started playing football at an early age when his talent shone through his playing for a number of youth clubs in and near his hometown.

Club career

Germany
Zandi was called up for the Germany under-17 national football team and played for SV Meppen before being signed by SC Freiburg. There, he failed to establish himself as a starter and was traded to the 2. Bundesliga club VfB Lübeck. After struggling again initially, Zandi broke through and established himself as one of the most dangerous and versatile attackers of the league. He regularly was one of the top scorers and assist givers.

After enjoying two successful seasons in Lübeck, he was signed by 1. FC Kaiserslautern in 2004 and given the number 10.

In the 2005–06 season, in which 1. FCK fell to the end of the table, he lost his position as a starting playmaker, was benched for a longer period of time, and had periods when he failed to be nominated as a bench player at all. Trainer Wolfgang Wolf refused to play him in the second half of the season, and after the relegation of the club, Zandi was confirmed to be cut from the squad. Also, Amir Ghalenoei, the new manager of Iran national team, did not invite Ferydoon to the Iranian squad for the AFC Asian Cup qualification games.

In September 2006, he signed a one-year contract with 2. Bundesliga club TuS Koblenz, which he left in January 2007 due to the limited number of appearance he made.

Cyprus
On 2 January 2007, Zandi signed a contract till the end of the 2006–07 season with Apollon Limassol of Cyprus.

After his return from the 2007 AFC Asian Cup he was linked with moves to Steaua București, Rapid București and Birmingham City.

On 18 January 2008, he joined Olympiakos Nicosia.

On 24 March 2009, Zandi signed Alki Larnaca for a one-year contract where he became the top scorer.

Iran
Zandi joined the Iranian side Steel Azin in 2009 and stayed there for two seasons.
After the relegation of Steel Azin he left the club and in August 2011 he joined to Esteghlal but he started season with an injury. On 22 October 2011, he made his debut for Esteghlal and made an assist against Zob Ahan Esfahan F.C. He won the Hazfi Cup in his first season.

Having been released by Esteghlal on 29 September 2012 Zandi joined the Qatari side Al Ahli. On 5 November 2015, he announced his retirement.

International career
Raised in Germany, Zandi did not initially have the permission to play for his ancestral Iran as he did not have Iranian citizenship. However, the Iranian Football Federation obtained permission for him to play for them, and Zandi began to compete on the Iran national team in the second round of 2006 FIFA World Cup qualification against Bahrain. After the qualifications he did not compete again on the team until being invited again for the 2007 AFC Asian Cup.

He was recalled to the national squad in March 2007 for a friendly against Qatar, included in the Asian Cup squad, and was featured for Iran in the friendly match against Mexico in June 2007. On 15 July 2007, Zandi scored from a free kick for Iran in their 2–2 draw versus China in the Asian Cup.

Zandi also played for Iran in the 2010 FIFA World Cup qualification where after the departure of Ali Daei he was not invited for around a year and was invited again by Afshin Ghotbi for a couple of performances but was dropped again. He was invited again after around 18 months by Carlos Queiroz for a friendly in May 2012 against Albania where before the match On 28 May 2012, Zandi announced his retirement from International football.

Coaching career

Dynamo Dresden
After signing as assistant coach of 2. Bundesliga club Dynamo Dresden in 2020, he was named head coach in March 2022 after Alexander Schmidt was sacked, but was replaced just two days later without managing a match.

Traffic accident
In 2005, Zandi was victim of a heavy traffic accident on a highway. When another car swerved to the left directly in front of him, Zandi had to evade and crashed into a lorry of the US Army. The lorry took heavy damage, and Zandi's car was utterly wrecked. Zandi made it out with minor injuries only.

Career statistics

Club

International
Scores and results list Iran's goal tally first, score column indicates score after each Zandi goal.

Honours
Esteghlal
Hazfi Cup: 2011–12

References

External links
Ferydoon Zandi at PersianLeague.com
Latest news, goal downloads, information on Zandi
Ferydoon Zandi at TeamMelli.com
Official Website

1979 births
Living people
People from Emden
Footballers from Lower Saxony
Association football midfielders
Iranian footballers
Iran international footballers
Germany youth international footballers
Germany under-21 international footballers
German people of Iranian descent
Regionalliga players
Oberliga (football) players
Bundesliga players
2. Bundesliga players
Cypriot First Division players
Persian Gulf Pro League players
Qatari Second Division players
Qatar Stars League players
SV Meppen players
SV Werder Bremen players
SC Freiburg players
VfB Lübeck players
1. FC Kaiserslautern players
TuS Koblenz players
Apollon Limassol FC players
Olympiakos Nicosia players
Alki Larnaca FC players
Steel Azin F.C. players
Esteghlal F.C. players
2006 FIFA World Cup players
2007 AFC Asian Cup players
Kickers Emden players
Al Ahli SC (Doha) players
Sportspeople of Iranian descent
FC St. Pauli non-playing staff
Expatriate footballers in Cyprus